Lakshman Jhula is a suspension bridge across the river Ganges.

Geography 
The bridge connects the villages of Tapovan to Jonk. Tapovan is in Tehri Garhwal district, on the west bank of the river, while Jonk is in Pauri Garhwal district, on the east bank. Lakshman Jhula is a pedestrian bridge also used by motorbikes. It is located on the outskirts of the city. It is a landmark of Rishikesh.

History 
As of November 5, 2020, this bridge is restricted to pedestrian access and is set to be closed permanently when a replacement is built parallel to it. Barriers on both sides prevent vehicular traffic including motorcycles and scooters.

It is said that the Hindu deity Lakshmana crossed the Ganges on jute ropes where the bridge is found.  Lakshman Jhula was completed in 1929.

Two plaques exist at the foot of the west side of the bridge.

The first plaque reads:

The second plaque reads:

Gallery

References 

Tourism in Uttarakhand
Bridges over the Ganges
Bridges completed in 1939
Bridges in Uttarakhand
Tehri Garhwal district
Suspension bridges
Rishikesh
Transport in Rishikesh
20th-century architecture in India